Calumet Township may refer to the following places in the United States:

 Calumet Township, Cook County, Illinois
 Calumet Township, Lake County, Indiana
 Calumet Township, Michigan

Township name disambiguation pages